Sibi (Urdu and) is a district in the Balochistan province of Pakistan. The main mountain ranges are Zen, Bambore and Dungan. The climatic and topography of Sibi District is quite varied  compared to other districts of Balochistan. It is also known as the "Hot spot" of Pakistan where the temperatures in the summer exceed 52.6 °C (126.7 °F). Until 2013 the district had two sub-divisions, Sibi and Lehri, further organized into Tehsils and sub-tehsils: Sibi, Lehri, Kutmandi and Sangan. Lehri was rejoined with Sibi district in 2018.

History
The early recorded history of Sibi District begins with the Hindu Sewa Dynasty. The Hindu Sewa dynasty ruled much of Baluchistan up until the 7th century AD. The Sibi division carved out of Quetta division still derives its name from Rani Sewi, the queen of the Hindu Sewa dynasty.

Until the end of the 15th century the district had been a dependency of Multan and had been part of Ghaznavid Empire ruled by petty chief named Nasiruddin Kubacha. Around 1500 it was taken by Shah Beg of the Arghun Dynasty from Samma Dynasty of Sindh and so came under the control of Kandahar. However, during the period of Mughal rule the territory was once again ruled from Multan. In 1714 the territory was conquered by the Kalhoras Amirs of Sindh, but they were then displaced by the Durranis. During the short rule of the Durranis, the local administrators were nominated from the Barozai Sub clan of the Panni( Panri) Tribe. In the 19th century it fell under Marris and Bugtis hand. To finish rebellion in the area as raised by Marri & Bugti Tribes, the British signed the treaty with Khan of Kalat in late 19th century were under the Sibi, Shalkot and Chagai territory leased out to British India.

The District of Sibi was established in 1903 during British Rule its area was larger than the current district and lay between 27°55' and 30°38'N and 67°17' and 69°50'E lying south of Loralai District, north of the Upper Sind Frontier District, west of Dera Ghazi Khan District and east of Kachhi, Bolan Pass and Quetta- Pishin.

In 1974 the district was subdivided to create Naseerabad and Kohlu districts, in 1983 Dera Bugti District, and in 1986 Ziarat District. Until 2000, except for Naseerabad, these new districts were part of Sibi Division of Pakistan. In 2000 the third-tier "divisions" structure of government was dissolved. Two further new districts were cleaved out of its territory: Harnai in 2007 and Lehri in 2013. Lehri was reannexed into Sibi in 2018.

Demographics
At the time of the 2017 census the district had a population of 179,751, of which 94,723 were males and 85,009 females. Rural population was 115,077 (64.02%) while the urban population was 64,674 (35.98%). The literacy rate was 45.97% - the male literacy rate was 57.71% while the female literacy rate was 32.85%.

Religion 
Islam was the predominant religion with 97.16%, while Hindus are 2.41% of the population. Sibi district had the highest proportion of Hindus of any district in Balochistan at the time of the 2017 census.

Languages

At the time of the 2017 census, 38.18% of the population spoke Balochi, 25.33% Sindhi, 17.82% Saraiki, 11.02% Pashto, 3.39% Brahui, 2.27% Punjabi and 1.73% Urdu as their first language.

Transport
Sibi is on the western edge of Pakistan and is well connected with the country by a wide network of roads, railways and airways.

Railways

Sibi Railway Station is a junction railway station. The railway track was lined in 1890s during the British era to link Sibi with rest of the country.

Festivals
The famous Sibi Mela first held in January 1885 a market for Livestock trade with passage of time adopted as cultural show, tent pegging, departmental exhibitions, musical show and sports festivals.

References

Bibliography

External links

 Sibi District at www.balochistan.gov.pk
 Sibi District at www.sibidistrict.com
 Sibi District at www.balochistanpolice.gov.pk
 Sibi District Development Profile 2011

 
Districts of Pakistan
Districts of Balochistan, Pakistan